Skippy (also known as Asta, 1931–1951) was a Wire Fox Terrier dog actor who appeared in dozens of movies during the 1930s. Skippy is best known for the role of the pet dog "Asta" in the 1934 detective comedy The Thin Man, starring William Powell and Myrna Loy, and for his role in the 1938 comedy Bringing Up Baby, starring Katharine Hepburn and Cary Grant. Due to the popularity of The Thin Man role, Skippy is sometimes credited as Asta in public and in other films.

Career

Skippy was trained by his owners Henry East and Gale Henry East, and also by Frank Weatherwax, and assistant trainers Rudd Weatherwax, and Frank Inn.

In 1936, Skippy and several other movie dogs were profiled in the book Dog Stars of Hollywood by Gertrude Orr. At the time Skippy was said to be four and a half years old, giving him a birth year of 1931–32. He was said to be one of the most intelligent of animal stars then working in pictures. In addition to verbal commands, he also worked to hand cues, essential for a dog performing in sound films. His training began when he was three months old, and he made his first professional film appearances at the age of one year, in 1932–33, as a bit player providing "atmosphere." In Orr's book Skippy was shown in a series of publicity shots with Wendy Barrie in It's a Small World, Mae Clarke in  The Daring Young Man and Mary Carlisle in an unidentified film. He became a star overnight in The Thin Man (1934).

Skippy also made a hit as "Mr. Smith" in the 1937 film The Awful Truth, in which his character was the subject of a custody dispute between characters portrayed by Cary Grant and Irene Dunne. (In a gaffe, Cary Grant wrestles and plays with "Mr. Smith" but can be heard distinctly calling him "Skippy".)

In Bringing Up Baby (1938), Skippy played "George," the bone-hiding pup belonging to Katharine Hepburn's aunt. In Topper Takes a Trip (1938), he was "Mr. Atlas".  

The American Magazine detailed Skippy's professional life in an August 1938 profile of the East kennels, titled "A Dog's Life in Hollywood":

Movie actresses stroke Skippy lovingly. They coo at him and murmur endearing terms in his ears. He takes it all in his stride, because, what with contracts, options, and exacting work before the movie cameras, he hasn't much time for the attentions of Hollywood's most beautiful stars. But if he's paid for it and given the proper cue he will snuggle in the arms of the loveliest of stars, gaze into her limpid eyes, and, if necessary—howl.

Skippy, a smart little wire-haired terrier, is one of the leading stars in pictures. He leads a glamorous life—a dog's life de luxe. He is rated as one of the smartest dogs in the world, and when contracts are signed for his appearance in a picture he gets $200 a week for putting his paw-print on the dotted line. His trainer gets a mere $60.

His owner is Mrs. Gale Henry East, once a prominent movie comedienne...When Skippy has to drink water in a scene, the first time he does it he really drinks. If there are retakes and he's had all the water he can drink, he'll go through the scene just as enthusiastically as though his throat were parched, but he'll fake it. If you watch closely you'll see he's just going through the motions of lapping and isn't really picking up water at all. And, because he has a sense of humor, he loves it when you laugh and tell him you've caught him faking but that it's all right with you.

"Treat a dog kindly and he'll do anything in the world for you."

At a time when most canine actors in Hollywood films earned $3.50 a day, Skippy's weekly salary was $250.00.

The Thin Man

As a character in the movie The Thin Man, Asta was the playful pet dog of Nick and Nora Charles, tugging them around town on his walks, hiding from danger, and sniffing out corpses. ("Asta, you're not a terrier, you're a police dog," Nick tells him.)  The character later appeared in the sequels After the Thin Man, Another Thin Man, Shadow of the Thin Man, The Thin Man Goes Home, Song of the Thin Man, as well as the 1950s television show The Thin Man.

Loy wrote that the actors were not allowed to interact with Skippy between takes; the Easts felt it would break his concentration. Skippy once bit Loy during filming.

The original character of Asta in Dashiell Hammett's book of The Thin Man was not a male Wire-Haired Fox Terrier, but a female Schnauzer. Due to the enormous popularity of the Asta character as played by Skippy, interest in pet terriers skyrocketed. Asta's enduring fame is such that the name is a frequent answer in The New York Times crossword puzzles (crosswordese), in response to clues such as "Thin Man dog" or "Dog star." 

Skippy played Asta in the first three Thin Man films. Other terriers, trained by the Weatherwax family and by Frank Inn, took on the role in subsequent films of the series, and in the television show.

Filmography

See also
 List of individual dogs

References

External links

Dog actors